The 1938 Boston University Terriers football team was an American football team that represented Boston University as an independent during the 1938 college football season. In its fifth season under head coach Pat Hanley, the team compiled a 3–4–1 record and outscored opponents by a total of 174 to 107.

Schedule

References

Boston University
Boston University Terriers football seasons
Boston University Terriers football